Saint Vincent and the Grenadines represents Saint Vincent and the Grenadines in international rugby union as the men's national team. It is ranked 81st in the world, as of 16 January 2023.

History

The St. Vincent and the Grenadines Rugby Union (SVGRU) came into existence on Sunday 18 January 1998, when the first game of touch rugby was played at the Sion Hill playing field using four traffic cones as pitch markers.

It all came about following a chance conversation. This stimulated an expatriate Englishman, John Townend, to return form his Christmas vacation in 1997 with plenty of enthusiasm and two rugby balls. John Townend contacted two Antipodean expatriates: Kelly Glass, a highly accomplished rugby player from South Island, New Zealand, and Geoff Hyde, an Australian tourism adviser, suggesting a game of touch rugby the following Sunday morning.  There were seven players at the first game: Carver Alexander, Ernst De Freitas, Kelly Glass, Kirk Hobson-Garcia, Geoff Hyde, John Townend and Delon Williams, a local Rastafarian who later became known as “Speedy”.

After playing for two hours, the group retired to Villa Beach with a crate of beer, to re-hydrate (any excuse would do) and to soothe aching muscles in the sea.  Rugby had been introduced to St. Vincent.

From the early days there was a strong interest from girls, who took an instant liking to the idea of “touch” rugby.  The games then continued every Sunday, and it was soon found that between Kirk, Kelly, Andrew, and Scott Hadley that there were already some excellent and accomplished players on the island.  In addition, they were able to attract other good players, namely Derek Hadley who was visiting from Australia and Father Pope Faifal from Samoa, working with the Catholic mission.  In terms of the girls, Jackie De Freitas soon joined, together with some Canadian volunteers, namely Janice Madill and Lisa Lilajehto.  One other girl who was to become a big favourite was Loretta “Hot Lips” Skrok.  She became notorious for her trick of taking a swig of strong rum and “flame throwing” at parties.  Peace Corps Volunteers Becky Buster and Maria Caluag also became great team members.  The local ranks were swelled by the contribution of Lorna “Turbo” Williams from Overland in the Carib community, Delia King from Calliaqua and Yvonne Bakker from Kingstown.

In the early days they were definitely seen as an expatriate group of Americans, Australians, British, Canadians, New Zealanders, Trinidadians, Samoans, and a few Vincentians.  Rugby was definitely perceived as a white man's sport and a relatively rough game at that.   It was soon expanded to playing on Wednesday afternoons as the numbers rose and transferred Sunday practices to Saturday.  Despite the expatriate character it was the Vincentians, notably Andrew Hadley and Jackie De Freitas who took the early lead in developing the club, with help from Geoff Hyde.

SVG Rugby has a significant history of developing home grown talent.  In the amateur era the female structure was highly successful, producing a large number of first team players and internationals.  In the transition to the professional era it was recognized that a clear development program was needed to develop “complete” players capable of playing professional rugby at the highest level.  A key difference between amateur and professional rugby is the physical demands placed on players.

They decided to call the team Amazona Guildingii after the rare and graceful Vincentian parrot, and selected the national colours of green, yellow and blue for their jerseys and shorts. Soon afterwards those that could afford it, purchased their own uniforms. Their motto is to "Strive to excellence and keep on striving til the end."

Matches and results
The first game ever played was against the British Royal Navy destroyer , on 8 February 1998. The game was won by the home side.

Saint Vincent and the Grenadines attempted to qualify for the 2007 Rugby World Cup in France, playing the first match of the Americas qualifying tournament. They played a preliminary qualifier against Saint Lucia in May 2005. The winner would progress to the South Pool of Round 1a, however, Saint Lucia won the match 36-25.

On March 29, 2008, Saint Vincent was defeated by Mexico 47-7 in a pre-qualifier for the right to enter the NAWIRA region qualifying process for Rugby World Cup 2011.

World Cup record
 1987 – No qualifying tournament held
 1991–2003 – Did not enter
 2007 – Did not qualify
 2011 – Did not qualify
 2015 – Did not qualify
 2019 – Did not qualify

Squad
Squad to 2012 NACRA Championship 23 June 2012

See also
 2011 Rugby World Cup - Americas qualification

References

External links
 Saint Vincent and the Grenadines on worldrugby.org
 SVG Rugby Union Website

Caribbean national rugby union teams
Rugby union in Saint Vincent and the Grenadines
Rugby union